Brigadier-General Edward Whitmore (1691 – 10 December 1761) was a British soldier who served in Europe and North America.

Biography
He was born in England in 1691, a son of Arthur Whitmore of York, England. He served in the War of the Austrian Succession, and was made lieutenant-colonel of the 36th Regiment of Foot in 1747. He was promoted in July 1757, colonel of the 22nd Regiment of Foot, and next year was made brigadier general. He was at the Siege of Louisburg in 1758, and, after the surrender of the town, was left there as military governor.

On a voyage to Boston in December 1761, the ship put into Plymouth, Massachusetts harbor to seek shelter from contrary winds. On 10 December 1761, near Plymouth, Whitmore, going on deck at midnight, accidentally fell overboard and drowned. His body was taken up next morning near the Gurnet, and carried to Boston in the same vessel. He was buried on 16 December 1761 in the King's Chapel.

References

Attribution
 This work in turn cites:
 Richard Brown, History of the Island of Cape Breton (London, 1869)
 Francis Parkman, Montcalm and Wolfe (Boston, 1885)
 William H. Whitmore, Old State-House Memorial (Boston, 1887)

1691 births
1761 deaths
Military personnel from York
British Army personnel of the War of the Austrian Succession
British military personnel of the French and Indian War
British Army generals
Cheshire Regiment officers
Worcestershire Regiment officers
Deaths by drowning
Accidental deaths in Massachusetts
Burials in Boston